Reid Glacier is an alpine glacier located on the west slope of Mount Hood in the U.S. state of Oregon. The glacier is the source of the Sandy River. The upper extent of the glacier is known for extensive crevasses.

The glacier is a remnant of the massive glaciers that formed during the last ice age.  It is bounded on the north by Yokum Ridge which also defines the southern side of Sandy Glacier, and by a ridge on the south bounding the north side of Zigzag Glacier.  The eastern and upper reaches of this ridge include Illumination Rock.  The uppermost portion of the glacier is below Leuthold Couloir. The glacier lies entirely within Mount Hood Wilderness.

Between 1907 and 2004, Reid Glacier lost 35% of its surface area.

See also
List of glaciers in the United States

References

Glaciers of Mount Hood
Glaciers of Clackamas County, Oregon
Mount Hood National Forest
Glaciers of Oregon